Athanasia Moraitou (born 2 April 1997) is a footballer who plays as a midfielder for SV Meppen in the Frauen-Bundesliga. Born in Germany, she represents Greece at international level.

Career
Moraitou has been capped for the Greece national team, appearing for the team during the 2019 FIFA Women's World Cup qualifying cycle.

Honours
South Alabama Jaguars
 Sun Belt Women's Soccer Tournament (1): 2019

Meppen
 2. Frauen-Bundesliga (1): 2021/22

Individual
 Sun Belt Newcomer of the Year: 2019
 All-Sun Belt first team: 2019

References

External links
 
 
 

1997 births
Living people
Citizens of Greece through descent
Greek women's footballers
Women's association football midfielders
Greece women's international footballers
South Alabama Jaguars women's soccer players
Greek expatriate women's footballers
Greek expatriate sportspeople in the United States
Expatriate women's soccer players in the United States
German women's footballers
Footballers from Baden-Württemberg
People from Waiblingen
Sportspeople from Stuttgart (region)
German people of Greek descent
Sportspeople of Greek descent
Frauen-Bundesliga players
German expatriate women's footballers
German expatriate sportspeople in the United States